Events from the year 1993 in Canada.

Incumbents

Crown 
 Monarch – Elizabeth II

Federal government 
 Governor General – Ray Hnatyshyn 
 Prime Minister – Brian Mulroney (until June 25) then Kim Campbell (June 25 to November 4) then Jean Chrétien
 Chief Justice – Antonio Lamer (Quebec) 
 Parliament – 34th (until September 8)

Provincial governments

Lieutenant governors 
Lieutenant Governor of Alberta – Gordon Towers  
Lieutenant Governor of British Columbia – David Lam
Lieutenant Governor of Manitoba – George Johnson (until March 5) then Yvon Dumont
Lieutenant Governor of New Brunswick – Gilbert Finn 
Lieutenant Governor of Newfoundland – Frederick Russell 
Lieutenant Governor of Nova Scotia – Lloyd Crouse 
Lieutenant Governor of Ontario – Hal Jackman 
Lieutenant Governor of Prince Edward Island – Marion Reid 
Lieutenant Governor of Quebec – Martial Asselin 
Lieutenant Governor of Saskatchewan – Sylvia Fedoruk

Premiers 
Premier of Alberta – Ralph Klein 
Premier of British Columbia – Mike Harcourt 
Premier of Manitoba – Gary Filmon 
Premier of New Brunswick – Frank McKenna 
Premier of Newfoundland – Clyde Wells 
Premier of Nova Scotia – Donald Cameron (until June 11) then John Savage 
Premier of Ontario – Bob Rae 
Premier of Prince Edward Island – Joe Ghiz (until January 25) then Catherine Callbeck 
Premier of Quebec – Robert Bourassa 
Premier of Saskatchewan – Roy Romanow

Territorial governments

Commissioners 
 Commissioner of Yukon –  John Kenneth McKinnon 
 Commissioner of Northwest Territories – Daniel L. Norris

Premiers 
Premier of the Northwest Territories – Nellie Cournoyea
Premier of Yukon – John Ostashek

Events

January to June
January 25 – Catherine Callbeck becomes premier of Prince Edward Island, replacing Joe Ghiz following a leadership election. This is Prince Edward Island's first female premier, and the first time in Canada that two provinces or territories have simultaneously had female premiers (until March 2011).
January 28 – Six Innu youths from Davis Inlet, aged 11 to 14, are caught on video sniffing gasoline as a suicide attempt.
February 24 – Prime Minister Brian Mulroney announces his resignation (effective June 25) amidst political and economic turmoil.
March 4 – Canadian soldiers shoot and kill a Somali man outside their base in Somalia.
March 12 – Governor General Ray Hnatyshyn proclaims a constitutional amendment adding section 16.1 to the Canadian Charter of Rights and Freedoms.
March 16 – Canadian soldiers beat to death Shidane Arone, a Somali teenager, in Somalia.
March 18 – Master Corporal Clayton Matchee is arrested in connection with Shidane Arone's death.
March 29 – 1993 Prince Edward Island general election: Catherine Callbeck's Liberals win a majority. She is the first female premier to lead a party to victory in a general election.
April 2 – The Farm Credit Corporation Act is passed.
June: The Nunavut Land Claims Agreement Act and the Nunavut Act are passed, leading to the eventual creation of Nunavut in 1999.
June 11 – John Savage becomes premier of Nova Scotia, replacing Donald Cameron.
June 15 – Alberta election: Ralph Klein's PCs win a seventh consecutive majority.
June 20 – A landslide on the South Nation River destroys the abandoned townsite of Lemieux, Ontario.
June 25 – Kim Campbell becomes prime minister, replacing Brian Mulroney. She is the first woman to be the country's head of government.

July to December
September 16 – Canadian forces engage in an intensive firefight with Croatian forces during Operation Medak Pocket.
October 4 – The Krever Inquiry into Canada's blood system begins.
October 14 – The Tories release an election ad that many see as mocking Jean Chrétien's facial paralysis.
October 23 - The Toronto Blue Jays defeat the Philadelphia Phillies, 4 games to 2, winning their second World Series Title.
October 25 – Federal election: Jean Chrétien's Liberals win a majority, defeating Kim Campbell's PCs, which are reduced to two seats. Campbell loses her own seat. The Bloc Québécois form the official opposition.
November 4 – Jean Chrétien is sworn in as prime minister, replacing Kim Campbell.

Full date unknown

Canadian Major-General Roméo Dallaire appointed commander of the U.N. forces in Rwanda.

Arts and literature

New works
Margaret Atwood, The Robber Bride
Réjean Ducharme, Dévadé
Dave Duncan, The Stricken Field
William Gibson, Virtual Light
Michael Ignatieff, Scar Tissue
Thomas King, One Good Story, That One
Antonine Maillet, Le nuit des roi
Yann Martel, The Facts Behind the Helsinki Roccamatios
Farley Mowat, My Father's Son
Robert J. Sawyer, Fossil Hunter
Jeffrey Simpson, Faultines, Struggling for a Canadian Vision

Awards
American-born E. Annie Proulx's The Shipping News, set in Newfoundland, wins the American National Book Award
See 1993 Governor General's Awards for a complete list of winners and finalists for those awards.
Books in Canada First Novel Award: John Steffler, The Afterlife of George Cartwright: A Novel
Geoffrey Bilson Award: Celia Barker Lottridge, Ticket to Curlew
Gerald Lampert Award: Elisabeth Harvor, Fortress of Chairs and Roberta Rees, Eyes Like Pigeons
Marian Engel Award: Sandra Birdsell
Pat Lowther Award: Lorna Crozier, Inventing the Hawk
Stephen Leacock Award: John Levesque, Waiting for Aquarius
Trillium Book Award: Jane Urquhart, Away and Margaret Atwood, The Robber Bride
Vicky Metcalf Award: Phoebe Gilman

Television
This Hour Has 22 Minutes premieres on CBC

Film
Harmony Cats earns 11 Genie Award nominations
Thirty Two Short Films About Glenn Gould is released

Music
Bryan Adams, So Far So Good
Jann Arden, Time for Mercy
The Band, Jericho
Big Sugar, Five Hundred Pounds
Blinker the Star, Blinker the Star
Blue Rodeo, Five Days in July
Cowboy Junkies, Pale Sun, Crescent Moon
Crash Test Dummies, God Shuffled His Feet
Crash Vegas, Stone
cub, Betti-Cola
Céline Dion, The Colour of My Love
Doughboys, Crush
Eric's Trip, Love Tara
Lawrence Gowan, ...but you can call me Larry
Great Big Sea, Great Big Sea
Grievous Angels, Watershed
Hart-Rouge, Blue Blue Windows
The Headstones, Picture of Health
I Mother Earth, Dig
The Inbreds, Hilario
Intermix, Phaze Two
Junkhouse, Here Lies Happiness and Strays
King Cobb Steelie, King Cobb Steelie
The Look People, Crazy Eggs
Lost Dakotas, Sun Machine
Sarah McLachlan, Fumbling Towards Ecstasy
Me Mom and Morgentaler, Shiva Space Machine
Moxy Früvous, Bargainville
Odds, Bedbugs
The Pursuit of Happiness, The Downward Road
The Rankin Family, North Country
Rose Chronicles, Dead and Gone to Heaven
Rush, Counterparts
Jane Siberry, When I Was a Boy
Skydiggers, Just Over This Mountain
Spirit of the West, Faithlift
The Tea Party, Splendor Solis
13 Engines, Perpetual Motion Machine
Shania Twain, Shania Twain
Voivod, The Outer Limits

Sport
February 23 – The Sacramento Gold Miners are established as the first US franchise in the Canadian Football League
March 12 to 14 – Toronto hosts the 1993 IAAF World Indoor Championships at the Skydome.
May 23 – The Sault Ste. Marie Greyhounds win their only Memorial Cup by defeating the Peterborough Petes 4 to 2. The entire tournament was played at Sault Memorial Gardens in Sault Ste. Marie, Ontario
June 9 – The Montreal Canadiens win their 24th (and last to date) Stanley Cup by defeating the Los Angeles Kings 4 games to 1. The deciding Game 5 was played at the Montreal Forum. Quebec City, Quebec's Patrick Roy is awarded the Conn Smythe Trophy
October 23 – The Toronto Blue Jays win their second  World Series by defeating the Philadelphia Phillies 4 games to 2. The deciding Game 6 was played at Skydome in Toronto making this the first World Series to be decided on Canadian soil.
November 4 – The Toronto Raptors are established as the National Basketball Association's first Canadian team since the Toronto Huskies in 1947. They will play their first game in 1995
November 20 – The Toronto Varsity Blues win their second (and first since 1965) Vanier Cup by defeating the Calgary Dinos by a score of 37–34 in the 29th Vanier Cup played Skydome in Toronto
November 28 – The Edmonton Eskimos win their 11th Grey Cup by defeating the Winnipeg Blue Bombers 33 to 23 in the 81st Grey Cup played at McMahon Stadium in Calgary.
Ben Johnson is permanently banned from international competition after again testing positive for banned substances.
 this is the only year in which the Stanley Cup and the World Series were both won by Canadian teams.

Births
January 4 – Aaryn Doyle, actress and singer
January 6 – Jesse Carere, actor
January 21 – Jason Godin, politician
January 26 – Cameron Bright, actor
January 28 – Hollie Lo, actress
February 24 – Phillip Danault, ice hockey player
March 14 – Demetrius Joyette, actor
March 15 – Alyssa Reid, singer-songwriter
March 15 – Mark Scheifele, ice hockey player
April 8  – Tyler Shaw, singer-songwriter
April 20 – Kurtis Gabriel, ice hockey player
April 23 – Brooke Palsson, actress
April 25 – Lyldoll, singer-songwriter
May 16 - Atticus Mitchell,  actor and musician
May 18 - Stuart Percy, hockey player
May 20 - Kevin Roy, hockey player
May 26 - Katerine Savard, swimmer
June 6 - Jesse Carere, actor
June 15 - Boone Jenner, ice hockey player
July 1 - Brett Ritchie, ice hockey player  
July 3 - PartyNextDoor, rapper, singer-songwriter, and record producer
July 9 - Emily Hirst, actress
July 28 – Hannah Lochner, actress
August 6 – Charlie Bilodeau, pair skater
September 1 - Alexander Conti, actor
November 28 - Stephanie Park, paralympic wheelchair basketball player
December 16 - Stephan James, actor
December 29 - Gabby May, artistic gymnast
Full date unknown - David Benoit, Canadian-American wrestler and son of Chris Benoit

Deaths
January 26 – Jeanne Sauvé, politician and first female Governor General of Canada (born 1922)
January 28 – Helen Hogg-Priestley, astronomer (born 1903)
February 28 – Ruby Keeler, actress, singer and dancer (born 1909)
April 2 – Alexander Bell Patterson, politician (born 1911)
April 15 – John Tuzo Wilson, geophysicist and geologist (born 1908)
April 30 – Colin Emerson Bennett, politician and lawyer (born 1908)
May 2 – Stephen Juba, politician and Mayor of Winnipeg (born 1914)
May 9 – Jacques Dextraze, Canadian general (born 1919)
May 30 – H. Gordon Barrett, politician (born 1915)
June 9 – Alexis Smith, actress (born 1921)
July 9 – Garry Hoy, lawyer (born 1955)
August 14 – Francis Mankiewicz, film director, screenwriter and producer (born 1944)
September 12 – Raymond Burr, actor (born 1917)
September 27 – Fraser MacPherson, jazz musician (born 1928)
October 24 – Tracy Latimer, murder victim (born 1980)

See also
 1993 in Canadian television
 List of Canadian films of 1993

References

 
Years of the 20th century in Canada
Canada
1993 in North America